Mehroyeh Wildlife Refuge is a wildlife refuge in Kerman Province, Iran.

References

Protected areas of Iran
Geography of Kerman Province